2301 Whitford, provisional designation , is a background asteroid from the outer regions of the asteroid belt, approximately  in diameter. It was discovered on 20 November 1965, by astronomers of the Indiana Asteroid Program at Goethe Link Observatory in the United States. The asteroid was named for American physicist and astronomer Albert Whitford. The uncommon L-type asteroid has a rotation period of 14.3 hours.

Orbit and classification 

Whitford is a non-family asteroid from the main belt's background population. It orbits the Sun in the outer main-belt at a distance of 2.5–3.9 AU once every 5 years and 8 months (2,073 days; semi-major axis of 3.18 AU). Its orbit has an eccentricity of 0.21 and an inclination of 12° with respect to the ecliptic.

Physical characteristics 

Whitford has been characterized as an uncommon L-type asteroid by Pan-STARRS photometric survey. It is also characterized as a common S-type asteroid in the SDSS-MFB (Masi Foglia Binzel) taxonomy.

Rotation period 

In April 2012, a rotational lightcurve of Whitford was obtained from photometric observations in the R-band by astronomers at the Palomar Transient Factory in California. Lightcurve analysis gave a rotation period of 14.275 hours with a brightness amplitude of 0.35 magnitude, superseding a previous measurement of 27.1 hours.

Diameter and albedo 

According to the surveys carried out by the Japanese Akari satellite and the NEOWISE mission of NASA's Wide-field Infrared Survey Explorer, Whitford measures between 17.40 and 19.47 kilometers in diameter and its surface has an albedo between 0.223 and 0.240.

The Collaborative Asteroid Lightcurve Link assumes a standard albedo for stony asteroids of 0.20 and calculates a diameter of 16.56 kilometers based on an absolute magnitude of 11.27.

Naming 

This minor planet was named after American physicist and astronomer Albert Whitford (1905–2002), who was a pioneer in photoelectric photometry. Whitford was also a director at the Washburn and Lick observatories, as well as a former president of the American Astronomical Society. The official naming citation was published by the Minor Planet Center on 20 December 1983.

Notes

References

External links 
 SDSS Masi–Foglia–Binzel Spectroscopic classification 
 Asteroid Lightcurve Database (LCDB), query form (info )
 Dictionary of Minor Planet Names, Google books
 Asteroids and comets rotation curves, CdR – Observatoire de Genève, Raoul Behrend
 Discovery Circumstances: Numbered Minor Planets (1)-(5000) – Minor Planet Center
 
 

002301
002301
Named minor planets
19651120